Tivadar Dienes-Öhm (20 October 1907 – 28 October 1944) was a Hungarian equestrian and soldier. He competed in the men's polo event at the 1936 Summer Olympics. He was killed in action during the Second World War.

References

1907 births
1944 deaths
Sportspeople from Pest County
Hungarian male equestrians
Olympic equestrians of Hungary
Hungarian military personnel of World War II
Hungarian military personnel killed in World War II
Polo players at the 1936 Summer Olympics
Olympic polo players of Hungary